Estadi Municipal de la Nova Creu Alta is a multi-use stadium in Sabadell, Catalonia, Spain. It is currently used mostly for football matches and hosts the home matches of CE Sabadell FC. The address of the stadium is Plaça Olímpia s/n, 08206 Sabadell, and the offices of the club are in the stadium. The stadium holds 11,908 people, after the last reform. The stadium was built in 1967.  During the 1992 Summer Olympics it hosted six football matches.

1992 Summer Olympic Games
  -  0 - 1
  -  1 - 1
  -  3 - 4
  -  4 - 0
  -  3 - 1
  -  1 - 1

See also
 CE Sabadell FC

References

External links
 Nova Creu Alta at cesabadell.cat
 Nova Creu Alta at cesabadell.org
 Estadios de España 

Sports venues completed in 1967
Football venues in Catalonia
Estadi de la Nova Creu Alta
Venues of the 1992 Summer Olympics
Olympic football venues